Begun is a surname. Notable people with the name include:

 Iosif Begun, Soviet refusenik
 Semi Joseph Begun (1905 – 1995), German-American engineer and inventor
 Vladimir Begun, Soviet zionologist

See also 
 Begun
 Begum 
 Begum (name)

Russian-language surnames
Germanic-language surnames